Martina Hingis was the defending champion but lost in the quarterfinals to Steffi Graf.

Graf won in the final 4–6, 6–3, 6–4 against Lindsay Davenport.

Seeds
A champion seed is indicated in bold text while text in italics indicates the round in which that seed was eliminated. The top four seeds received a bye to the second round.

  Lindsay Davenport (final)
  Martina Hingis (quarterfinals)
  Jana Novotná (second round)
  Arantxa Sánchez-Vicario (second round)
  Monica Seles (semifinals)
  Nathalie Tauziat (semifinals)
  Patty Schnyder (second round)
  Sandrine Testud (first round)

Draw

Final

Section 1

Section 2

External links
 1998 Advanta Championships of Philadelphia Draw

Advanta Championships of Philadelphia
1998 WTA Tour